Bernathonomus aureopuncta is a moth of the family Erebidae. It is found in Colombia, Ecuador, Bolivia, Costa Rica and Panama.

References

Phaegopterina
Moths described in 1916